Horizons is the fifth album led by saxophonist Charles McPherson recorded in 1968 and released on the Prestige label.

Reception

Allmusic awarded the album 3 stars with its review by Scott Yanow stating, "By playing bop-oriented music in 1968, Charles McPherson could have been considered behind the times, but he was never a fad chaser and he has long had a timeless style. This music still sounds viable and creative decades later".

Track listing 
All compositions by Charles McPherson except as indicated
 "Horizons" - 5:47  
 "Lush Life" (Billy Strayhorn) - 8:04  
 "Ain't That Somethin'" - 5:18  
 "Night Eyes" - 5:14  
 "I Should Care" (Sammy Cahn, Axel Stordahl, Paul Weston) - 6:38  
 "She Loves Me" - 7:16

Personnel 
Charles McPherson - alto saxophone
Nasir Rashid Hafiz - vibraphone
Cedar Walton - piano
Pat Martino - guitar
Walter Booker - bass
Billy Higgins - drums

References 

Charles McPherson (musician) albums
1969 albums
Prestige Records albums
Albums produced by Don Schlitten